The 2016–17 season was Newport County's fourth consecutive season in Football League Two, 64th season in the Football League and 96th season of league football overall. The season saw Newport achieve a second "Great Escape" after that of the 1976–77 season. Having been 11 points adrift in March, they avoided relegation on the final day of the season.

Season review

League
The season began in much the same fashion as the previous season had finished, with County securing only a single win from their first nine matches. With the club finding itself bottom of the league, manager Warren Feeney was sacked on 28 September.

Goalkeeper player/coach James Bittner and fellow first-team coach Sean McCarthy were named joint caretaker managers. Their only matches in charge were the 2–1 home defeat against Swansea City Under-23s in the League Trophy fixture on 4 October  and the League Two 0–0 draw versus Colchester United on 8 October.

Graham Westley was appointed team manager effective from 10 October with Dino Maamria his assistant manager. Despite losing the first two league games, form improved and Newport went seven games unbeaten in all competitions, including three successive league wins in October and November. County were now just outside the relegation places, but this was to last just the one game. In a disastrous spell, the next eight games were lost, with Newport falling ever further from safety.
Following draws with Colchester United and Barnet, a vital win was secured against Hartlepool United, but that was the last of Westley's tenure. Of the next seven games, four were drawn and three lost, including a 4–0 humiliation to fellow strugglers Leyton Orient. Westley was sacked on 9 March with County now 11 points adrift of safety with 12 games left to play. Newport-born Mike Flynn, who had been brought back as a player by Westley, took over as manager, with Lennie Lawrence as assistant.

Flynn's impact was instant, with back-to-back wins against Crewe Alexandra and Morecambe in March, and consecutive 1–0 wins against Crawley Town, Exeter City and Yeovil Town in April, he had accrued more league wins in his eight games in charge than Westley had in 24. With four games left, County were no longer bottom, but still in a relegation place. The next game at promotion-chasing Plymouth Argyle was lost 6–1, confirming the host's place in League One, but with relegation rivals Hartlepool United losing 2–1 at bottom-of-the-table Leyton Orient, County were only one point behind them.

At home to Accrington Stanley, County recorded another vital 1–0 win to climb out of the bottom two for the first time in five months, two points clear of Hartlepool. With two games now remaining, their fate was now in their own hands.

In the penultimate game of the season, a County win combined with a Hartlepool loss would see Newport safe. County took the lead at Carlisle United in the 12th minute, and Hartlepool were losing at Cheltenham Town in the 17th. However, two goals from Carlisle in the second half meant that both Newport and Hartlepool lost, leaving County still two points clear with a single game remaining.

For the final decisive game of the season, Newport were home to mid-table Notts County and Hartlepool were at home to promoted Doncaster Rovers. With County two points clear, anything other than a win for Hartlepool would see Newport safe and them relegated. If United won and County could only draw then County would be relegated on goal difference — a hangover of their 6–1 drubbing in Plymouth. For the first 30 minutes both games were deadlocked at 0–0 — enough to keep county up. On 31 minutes, Andy Williams scored for Doncaster and on 34 minutes Mickey Demetriou scored a penalty for County, who were now five points clear as things stood. In the second half, Jorge Grant scored an equaliser for Notts County in the 62nd minute — Newport were now only three points clear, but still safe. Coming up to the last 15 minutes of each game it looked likely that that was how both games would end, but Devante Rodney scored an equaliser for Pools in the 74th minute. Newport now knew that another Hartlepool goal would win it for them and condemn County to relegation. Eight minutes later Rodney scored his second, putting Hartlepool in front and keeping Pools up on goal difference. With the clock ticking down to full-time, County defender Mark O'Brien pushed forward in the 89th minute and scored the winner for Newport to complete the Great Escape and relegate Pools.

Mike Flynn had inspired a written-off squad to seven wins in twelve matches, which included games against six of those who finished in the League Two top seven, achieved on the worst pitch in the Football League.

Cup
In the League Cup Round 1, County were drawn at home to Milton Keynes Dons. Despite leading 2–0, goals in the 63rd, 70th and 90th minutes for the visitors secured them the win and progression into the second round.

In the EFL Trophy, County finished bottom of Group B following defeats to Plymouth Argyle and the Swansea City Under-23s, and a sole win against AFC Wimbledon.

In the FA Cup, County were drawn away at National League North qualifiers Alfreton Town. Despite taking the lead in the 65th minute, Town equalised in the 74th minute to force a replay at Rodney Parade. That game was won 4–1 after extra time, as County had again taken the lead in the 68th minute, only for Town to equalise in the 74th. The second-round match away at Plymouth Argyle	was drawn 0–0, forcing another replay at Rodney Parade. In the intervening period, the draw for the third round had taken place, with the winners rewarded with a trip to Premier League Liverpool. The game went into extra time as it too finished 0–0. Argyle were awarded a penalty shortly into the first period of extra time, but Paul Garita hit the post. They were awarded a second with 10 minutes of extra time remaining and Graham Carey made no mistake to score the winner and send Plymouth to Anfield.

Results summary

Results by round

Transfers

Transfers in

Loans in

Transfers out

Loans out

Managerial statistics 
Only competitive games from the 2016–17 season are included.

Competitions

Pre-season friendlies
On 5 July 2016, Newport County announced a pre-season tour of Poland.

League Two table

League Two

EFL Cup

EFL Trophy

FA Cup

References

2016-17
2016–17 EFL League Two by team